Apetumodu is traditional title of ruler of Ipetumodu, a notable town in Osun state of Nigeria. Apetumodu is first class Oba and vice chairman of Osun state council of king. Akalako was the first Apetumodu, The current Apetumodu is Oba Joseph Olugbenga Oloyede Latimogun I, he ascended the throne in 2019.

Past Apetumodu of Ipetumodu

Notes
There are several kings between Akalako and Fagbemokun but their name and period of reign have lost due to poor record. But starting from fagbemokun, the names of kings and their period of reign are accurate.

References

Nigerian traditional rulers